George M. Smith (May 18, 1912 – October 21, 1962) was a Wisconsin politician. He was born in Montreal, Quebec, Canada, in 1912 and attended college in Winnipeg. He emigrated to Milwaukee, Wisconsin, in the United States in 1941, and became a United States citizen in 1944. In 1948 he was nominated for Lieutenant Governor of Wisconsin, an office which he held for three terms, from 1949 until 1955. He was a Republican.

Notes

References 

1912 births
1962 deaths
Lieutenant Governors of Wisconsin
Wisconsin Republicans
20th-century American politicians
Politicians from Montreal
Politicians from Milwaukee
Canadian emigrants to the United States